Philip Harder is a music video director and commercial director represented by Bob Industries in Santa Monica, California. Phil was also a director at Quentin Tarantino's A Band Apart Commercials and Music Videos where he directed award-winning commercials for clients including The Gap. According to co-founder and executive producer Michael Bodnarchek, "Phil is one of the most creative directors I have worked with in my career." He also had a music video company Harder/Fuller Films, from 1985 to 2005. In the 1980s, Harder was in the band Breaking Circus, as well as a founding member of Big Trouble House, a rock trio active throughout the 1990s.

Harder was the cinematographer on the Japanese feature film Yoko, The Cherry Blossom shot in Tokyo.

Filmography

Music videos

1985
The Jayhawks – "King of Kings"
1986
Rifle Sport – "Burn 'Em Up"
Sonic Youth – "Stereo Sanctity"
1987
Agitpop – "Girl But Not a Friend"
Big Black – "Dead Billy"
Big Black – "Pigeon Kill"
Big Black – "Cables"
Big Black – "Big Money"
Black Spot – "Bad Ass Hammer"
The Didjits – "Max Wedge"
The Didjits – "Axehandle"
Naked Raygun – "Vanilla Blue"
1988
Agitpop – "Stop Drop and Roll"
Big Trouble House – "Afghanistan"
Breaking Circus – "Shockhammer 13"
Breaking Circus – "Evil Last Night"
Breaking Circus – "Three Cool Cats"
The Magnolias – "Pardon Me"
Rapeman – "Hated Chinee"
Rapeman – "Budd"
Shane – "Ride, Ride, Ride"
Soul Asylum – "P-9"
1989
The Afghan Whigs – "Sister, Brother" (1989)
Agitpop – "Forget Me Not" – (1989)
Chicken Scratch – "Undertoe"
Poopshovel – "One Pass Away" (1989)
Soul Asylum – "Artificial Heart"

1990
Another Carnival – "Rain on Me"
Arson Garden – "Two Sisters"
Babes in Toyland – "He's My Thing"
Big Chief – "Drive It Off"
Big Trouble House – "Black River"
Big Trouble House – "Union Feed Grain Mill"
Chicken Scratch – "Tom Takes Toilets To Tinseltown"
Joe Henry (with Don Cherry) – "John Hanging"
Brenda Kahn – "The Ballad of Ridge Street"
Brenda Kahn – "If Red Were Blue"
Libido Boyz – "Godzilla"
1991
The Afghan Whigs – "Turn on the Water"
The Afghan Whigs – "Conjure Me"
The Afghan Whigs – "Miles Iz Ded"
Another Carnival – "Still"
Bone Club – "Apple"
Drophammer – "Mind and Body"
Firehose – "Walking the Cow"
Brenda Kahn – "Eggs on Drugs"
The Magnolias – "When I'm Not"
The Magnolias – "Hello or Goodbye"
Overwhelming Colorfast – "It's Tomorrow"
1992
The Afghan Whigs – "Come See About Me"
Steven "Jesse" Bernstein – "More Noise Please"
Bone Club – "It's Not Alright"
Chainsaw Kittens – "Connie I've Found The Door"
Billy Childish and The Blackhands – "Crying Blud"
Fat Tuesday – "High and Low"
Joe Henry – "King's Highway"
Kise – "Slop My Donkey"
Seaweed – "Squint"
Sick of It All – "Just Look Around"
The Wedding Present – "No Christmas"
The Wedding Present – "Boing"
The Wedding Present – "Blue Eyes"
The Wedding Present – "Chant of the Ever Circling Skeletal Family"
1993
The Afghan Whigs – "Debonair"
The Afghan Whigs – "Gentlemen"
Babes in Toyland – "He's My Thing"
Bailter Space – "X"
Chainsaw Kittens – "Angel on the Range"
Firehose – "Witness"
Firehose – "Formal Introduction"
Stigmata A-Go-Go – "Like Bone"
Velocity Girl – "Audrey's Eyes"
1994
The Afghan Whigs – "My Curse"
Low – "Words"
Mercy Rule -"Tell Tomorrow"
Nova Mob – "Old Empire"
Stigmata A-Go-Go – "Riot Keeper"

1995
Ash – "Jack Names the Planets"
Babes in Toyland – "Sweet 69"
Compulsion – "Question Time for the Proles"
Low – "Shame"
Son Volt – "Drown"
Venison – "Cooking Dirt"
1996
Compulsion – "Juvenile Scene Detective"
The Connells – "Fifth Fret"
Failure – "Stuck On You"
The Goops – "Vulgar Appetite"
Low – "Over the Ocean"
Red House Painters – "All Mixed Up"
Versus – "Yeah You"
1997
Bettie Serveert – "Rudder"
Cornershop – "Brimful of Asha"
Tanya Donelly – "The Bright Light"
Hum – "Comin' Home"
Local H – "Eddie Vedder"
Local H – "Fritz's Corner"
Lisa Loeb – "I Do"
Bobby McFerrin – "Circle Song 6"
Shudder to Think – "Red House"
Souls – "Cello"
1998
Cornershop – "Sleep on the Left Side"
Esthero – "Heaven Sent"
Everclear – "Rudolph the Red-Nosed Reindeer" (Gap Ad)
Goodie Mob featuring Esthero - "The World I Know"
Local H – "All the Kids Are Right"
Mary Lou Lord – "Lights Are Changing"
Johnny Mathis – "Most Wonderful Time of the Year" (Gap Ad)
Mocrac – "In My Pocket"
Scrawl – "Charles
Rufus Wainwright – "What Are You Doing New Years' Eve?" (Gap Ad)

1999
Barenaked Ladies – "Get in Line"
The Cranberries – "Just My Imagination"
Dovetail Joint – "Level on the Inside"
Ben Lee – "Cigarettes Will Kill You"
Moist – "Breathe"

2000
Barenaked Ladies – "Pinch Me"
Foo Fighters – "Next Year"
Macy Gray – "Why Didn't You Call Me" (Target Ad)
Incubus – "Stellar"
Chantal Kreviazuk – "Faraway"

2001
Barenaked Ladies – "Too Little Too Late"
The Honeydogs – "Sour Grapes"
Incubus – "Drive"
Incubus – "Wish You Were Here"
Mansun – "Fool"
Matchbox Twenty – "Mad Season"
Pulp – "The Trees"
Remy Zero – "Save Me"

2002
Local H – "Half Life"
Mad at Gravity – "Walk Away"
Chitlin' Fooks featuring Carol Van Dyk – "The Battle"
The Dollyrots – "Tease Me, Pet Me" (Hewlett-Packard Ad)
Low – "Canada"
Matchbox Twenty – "Disease"

2003
Barenaked Ladies – "Another Postcard"
Liz Phair – "Why Can't I?"
Shane – "End of the Line"

2004
Barenaked Ladies – "Testing 1,2,3"
The Music – "Breakin'"
Liz Phair – "Extraordinary"
Prince – "Cinnamon Girl"
Skye Sweetnam – "Tangled Up in Me"
Yellowcard – "Only One"

2005
Aslyn – "Be the Girl"
Hilary Duff – "Beat of My Heart"
Low – "Monkey"
Liz Phair – "Everything to Me"
Stan Ridgway – "Beloved Movie Star"
Rob Thomas – "Lonely No More" (Target Ad)
2006
The Fratellis – "Flathead" (iPod Animated Commercial)
The Fratellis – "Flathead" (iPod "Party" Commercial)
Rob Thomas – "Ever the Same"

2007
Cary Brothers – "Who You Are"
Billy Talent – "Surrender"

2008
Low – "Everybody's Song"
The Owls – "Channel"
The Afghan Whigs – "Algiers"

2009
The Twilight Hours – "Alone"
Zak Sally – "Why We Hide"
Low – "Breaker"

2010
Barenaked Ladies – "You Run Away"
Bettie Serveert – "Pharmacy of Love"
Low – "Cue The Strings"
Low – "Death of a Salesman - Acoustic"

2011
CSS featuring Ssion – "City Grrrl"
Robert Plant – "Silver Rider"
Nada Surf – "When I Was Young"
Low – "Especially Me"
Typsy Panthre – "All Fall Down"

2012
The Script – "Six Degrees of Separation"
Low – "Murderer"
Typsy Panthre – "Hitch-Hiker"

2013
Billy Talent – "Stand Up and Run"
Low – "Just Make It Stop"
The Starfolk – "Into The Clouds"

2014
The Afghan Whigs – "Algiers"
Trampled by Turtles – "Are You Behind the Shining Star"
Trampled by Turtles – "Wild Animals"
The Afghan Whigs – "Matamoros"
The Afghan Whigs – "Lost in the Woods"
Kevin Hearn – "Gallerina"

2015
Matt Ellis – "Thank You Los Angeles"
Rob Thomas – "Trust You"
Billy Talent – "Chasing the Sun"

2017
The Afghan Whigs – "Demon In Profile"

2020
Greg Dulli – "Pantomima"

Films

References

External links
Official Website for Phil Harder

Phil Harder at Mvdbase.com
 Bob Industries official site
Minnesota Monthly - Phil Harder
City Pages - Phil Harder
 USA Today - Low Movie
 Brooklyn Based - Low Movie
Video Static - Low "Just Make It Stop
Indie-Eye - Afghan Whigs "Matamoros"
Star Tribune - Trampled By Turtles "Wild Animals"
Brooklyn Film Festival - Short "Flying Lesson"
New York Live Arts - Short "Flying Lesson"
Last FM - Foo Fighters "Next Year"
The Inspiration Room - Apple iPod "Party" & "Animated"
Billboard - Prince "Cinnamon Girl"
People - Prince "Cinnamon Girl"
MTV - Incubus "Drive"
The Guardian - Cornershop "Brimful of Asha"
Star Tribune - Documentary "The Claw"

American music video directors
Living people
People from Santa Monica, California
1965 births
American alternative rock musicians
Film directors from Minnesota
Film directors from California